This page details statistics of the Munster Senior Hurling Championship.

General performances

By county

Teams

By decade
The most successful team of each decade, judged by number of Munster Senior Hurling Championship titles, is as follows:

 1890s: 4 each for Cork (1890-92-93-94) and Tipperary (1895-96-98-99)
 1900s: 6 for Cork (1901-02-03-04-05-07)
 1910s: 3 each for Cork (1912-15-19); Limerick (1910-11-18) and Tipperary (1913-16-17)
 1920s: 5 for Cork (1920-26-27-28-29)
 1930s: 4 for Limerick (1933-34-35-36)
 1940s: 5 for Cork (1942-43-44-46-47)
 1950s: 4 for Cork (1952-53-54-56)
 1960s: 7 for Tipperary (1960-61-62-64-65-67-68)
 1970s: 7 for Cork (1970-72-75-76-77-78-79)
 1980s: 5 for Cork (1982-83-84-85-86)
 1990s: 3 each for Clare (1995-97-98) and Cork (1990-92-99)
 2000s: 4 for Cork (2000-03-05-06)
 2010s: 4 for Tipperary (2011-12-15-16)

Other records

Biggest wins

 The most one sided Munster finals since 1896 when goals were made equal to three points:
 31 points – 1918: Limerick 11-3 (36) – (5) 1-2 Clare
 31 points – 1982: Cork 5-31 (46) – (15) 3-6 Waterford
 28 points – 1893: Cork 5-13 (28) – (0) 0-0 Limerick
 27 points – 1903: Cork 5-16 (31) – (4) 1-1 Waterford
 26 points – 1905: Cork 7-12 (33) – (7) 1-4 Limerick
 23 points – 1899: Tipperary 5-16 (31) – (8) 0-8 Clare
 22 points – 1900: Tipperary 6-11 (29) – (7) 2-1 Kerry
 22 points – 1972: Cork 6-18 (36) – (14) 2-8 Clare
 21 points – 2016: Tipperary 5-19 (34) – (13 0-13 Waterford
 21 points – 1896: Tipperary 7-9 (30) – (9) 2-3 Cork
 21 points – 2011: Tipperary 7-19 (40) - (19) 0-19 Waterford
 20 points – 1962: Tipperary 5-14 (29) – (9) 2-3 Waterford
 19 points – 1915: Cork 8-2 (26) – (7) 2-1 Clare
 19 points – 1983: Cork 3-22 (31) – (12) 0-12 Waterford
 18 points – 1993: Tipperary 3-27 (36) – (18) 2-12 Clare
 18 points – 1965: Tipperary 4-11 (23) – (5) 0-5 Cork
 The most one sided games from the semi-final and quarter-final stages of the championship:
 42 points – 1923: Cork 13-4 (43) – (1) 0-1 Waterford
 41 points – 1904: Tipperary 8-21 (45) – (4) 0-4 Waterford
 34 points – 2000: Cork 2-32 (38) – (4) 0-4 Kerry
 34 points – 1953: Clare 10-8 (38) – (4) 1-1 Limerick
 32 points – 1960: Tipperary 10-9 (39) – (7) 2-1 Limerick

Successful defending

Only 4 teams of the 6 who have won the Munster championship have ever successfully defended the title. These are:
 Cork on 27 attempts out of 50 (1893, 1894, 1902, 1903, 1904, 1905, 1920, 1927, 1928, 1929, 1943, 1944, 1947, 1953, 1954, 1970, 1976, 1977, 1978, 1979, 1983, 1984, 1985, 1986, 2000, 2006, 2018)
 Tipperary on 16 attempts out of 40 (1896, 1899, 1900, 1909, 1917, 1925, 1950, 1951, 1961, 1962, 1965, 1968, 1988, 1989, 2009, 2012)
 Limerick on 9 attempts out of 22 (1911, 1934, 1935, 1936, 1974, 1981, 2020, 2021, 2022)
 Clare on 1 attempt out of 6 (1998)

Gaps

 Top ten longest gaps between successive Munster titles:
 63 years: Clare (1932-1995)
 39 years: Waterford (1963-2002)
 25 years: Clare (1889-1914)
 18 years: Limerick (1955-1973)
 18 years: Clare (1914-1932)
 17 years: Limerick (1996-2013)
 16 years: Tipperary (1971-1987)
 15 years: Limerick (1940-1955)
 13 years: Limerick (1981-1994)
 13 years: Limerick (1897-1910)

Longest undefeated run

The record for the longest unbeaten run stands at 15 games held by Cork. It began with a 1-19 to 2-8 win against Tipperary in the quarter-final of the 1982 championship and finished with a 1-18 apiece draw with Tipperary in the Munster final of the 1987 championship. The 15-game unbeaten streak, which included just one drawn game, ended with a 4-22 to 1-22 extra-time loss to Tipperary in the replay of the 1987 Munster final.

Players

Top scorers

All time

This is a list of players who have scored a cumulative total of 100 points or more in the Munster Championship.

By year

Single game

Finals

All-time appearances

Munster final appearances

Munster medal winners

Other records

Winners of Munster medals on the field of play in each of three decades:
Paddy Ahern of Cork: 1919, 1920, 1926, 1927, 1928, 1929, 1931
Tommy Doyle of Tipperary: 1937, 1942, 1945, 1949, 1950, 1951
Jimmy Doyle of Tipperary: 1958, 1960, 1961, 1962, 1964, 1965, 1967, 1968, 1971
Ray Cummins of Cork: 1969, 1970, 1972, 1975, 1976, 1977, 1978, 1979, 1982
Declan Ryan of Tipperary: 1988, 1989, 1991, 1993, 2001

Matches

Attendances

Overall

Finals

See also
 All-Ireland Senior Hurling Championship records and statistics
 Leinster Senior Hurling Championship records and statistics

External links
 Munster Senior Hurling Final winning teams

References

Hurling records and statistics
Records